Ichitan Company is a Thai beverage company that manufactures green tea drinks, herbal drinks, fruit drinks, and energy drinks.

History 
Ichitan company was founded by Tan Passakornatee who was the original founder of Oishi Group. Ichitan company incorporated the company on the third of September 2010. Later, the company registered capital for 1,300 million baht and a paid up capital of 1,300 million baht into ordinary shares on December 31, 2015. On August 27, 2014 Ichitan company, Mitsubishi Corporation and PT Sigmantara Alfindo have entered into a joint venture which aims to produce and sell Ichitan drinks in Indonesia.

Products 
Ichitan Greentea is the main seller of Ichitan company which consists of 7 flavors: Original, Honey Lemon, Genmaicha, Chrysanthemum, Lychee, Sugar Free, and Oolong Sugar Free. Ichitan Greentea also includes 4 packages: 420 ml, 600 ml, 840 ml, and UHT 300 ml. All Ichitan's tea is made with organic tea plants.
Ichitan Chew Chew is tea with Nata de coco that comes with 3 flavors: Kyoho Grape, Strawberry, and Lychee.
Dragon Black Tea is made from black tea and it has 3 flavors: Mulberry, Apple, and Lemon.
Yen Yen Cool Herb Tea is Ichitan's first herbal beverage which is a mixture of 7 chinese herbs. The herbs are jiaogulan, grassjelly, mulberry, luo han guo, chrysanthemum, safflower flower, and bael.

References 

Food and drink companies of Thailand
Manufacturing companies based in Bangkok
Thai drink brands